Liu Haixing (born April 1963) is a Chinese diplomat and politician, currently serving as executive deputy director of the .

He is a representative of the 20th National Congress of the Chinese Communist Party and a member of the 20th Central Committee of the Chinese Communist Party. He is a delegate to the 13th National People's Congress.

Biography
His ancestral home is in Jiangyin, Jiangsu. 

After graduating from Beijing Foreign Studies University in 1985, he joined the Foreign Service. From 1987 to 1988, he studied at the International School of Public Administration in Paris, France. He returned to China in 1988 and continued to work at the Translation Office of the Ministry of Foreign Affairs. From 1994 to 1996, he studied at the National School of Administration. After working in the Translation Office of the Ministry of Foreign Affairs for two years, he was appointed first secretary of the Chinese Embassy in France in 1998. In 2002, he became counsellor of the Permanent Mission of the People's Republic of China to the United Nations. He was made deputy director of the Western Europe Department of the Ministry of Foreign Affairs in 2003, and served until 2009, when he was chosen as envoy of the Chinese Embassy in France. In 2012, he succeeded  as director of the European Department of the Ministry of Foreign Affairs, a post he kept until 2015. In 2015, he was promoted to become assistant foreign minister, a position he held until 2017. 

In March 2018, he took office as vice chairperson of the Supervision and Judicial Committee of the National People's Congress.

Personal life 
Liu married diplomat , who bore him a daughter.

References

1963 births
Living people
Beijing Foreign Studies University alumni
Chinese Communist Party politicians from Beijing
École nationale d'administration alumni
Members of the 20th Central Committee of the Chinese Communist Party
Members of the Standing Committee of the 13th National People's Congress
People from Jiangyin
People's Republic of China politicians from Beijing